The St Albans Football Club is an Australian rules football club based at Kings Park Reserve in Kings Park, a north-western suburb of Melbourne.

Founded in 1947, the club participated in the Western Region Football League until 2022, after which the club moved to the Essendon District Football League. To date, St Albans has won five Division One Premierships, the most recent being in 2001. They have also won 1 Division 2 Premiership.

St Albans currently has 7 Junior teams, ranging from Under 10s to Under 18s, two open age Female teams and two Senior Men's teams.

History
A public meeting was called to be held at the St Albans Fire Station in September 1946. The reason for this meeting was to form a Football Club, that is the St Albans Football Club as we know it today. Twenty-six people attended this meeting and Mr W E Perrett was elected as President for the first year. Moreover, Mr J Douglas and Mr S Taylor were appointed secretary and coach respectively. The club was to be located at Errington Reserve. Mr S Taylor and Mr A McPherson were elected as captain and vice captain respectively.

In March, St Albans FC was officially accepted into the Western Region Football League, which was at the time  known as the Footscray District Football League. Competitive matches were to start on the 26th of the following month. Nevertheless, before the commencement of the league, St Albans opted to play a practice match against ICI from Deer Park, its first ever match. 

In December 2022 the club transitioned across to the Essendon District Football League and will compete in the 2023 season in Division One.

In June 1995 the east wing at Kings Park Reserve was renamed the ‘Cutajar wing’ after Chris ‘rat’ Cutajar was rumoured to have had a 40 possession quarter. Cutajar’s footballing career stalled following a brief foray in the music industry as part of King Delamere an Evanescence cover band.

Honours

Club
 Western Region Football League
 Division One (5): 1966, 1969, 1988, 1989, 2001
 Division Two (1): 1997

Individual

Best & Fairest

 1947 R Priest
 1949 S Taylor/A McPherson
 1950 K Priest
 1951 D McPherson
 1958 G Haynes
 1959 G Haynes
 1960 G Haynes
 1961 W Dawidowicz
 1962 T McIntyre
 1963 W Dawidowicz
 1964 G Haynes
 1965 F Uscinas
 1966 I Sharp
 1967 T Munday
 1968 R Toby
 1969 G Cameron
 1970 F Van Leeuwen
 1971 G Cameron
 1972 J Stanecki
 1973 N Farrell
 1974 R Szwaj
 1975 A Tansis
 1976 R Szwaj
 1977 R Bradley
 1978 J Blyth
 1979 J Blyth
 1980 R Peterson
 1981 J Blyth
 1982 R Peterson
 1983 R Peterson
 1984 R Peterson
 1985 L Foreman
 1986 L Foreman
 1987 D Templar
 1988 S McGhie
 1989 S McGhie
 1990 S Haynes
 1991 A Walsh
 1992 P Mala
 1993 S Millo
 1994 J Fitzpatrick
 1995 S Millo
 1996 M Antonowicz
 1997 A Fennessy
 1998 M Antonowicz
 1999 M Antonowicz 
 2000 J Skinner
 2001 J Fitzpatrick
 2002 A Ibrahim
 2003 A Szwadiak
 2004 D McFerran
 2005 S Arena
 2006 S Arena
 2007 M Agius
 2008 B Hollow
 2009 T Jenkins
 2010 T Jenkins
 2011 S Hoare
 2012 B Taylor
 2013 L Baddeley
 2014 J West
 2015 M Quigley
 2016 T Jenkins
 2017 T Jenkins
 2018 T Donoghue
 2019 D Kovacevic

300 Game Players

 Joe Maziarz
 Rod Toby
 Paul Shanley
 Jeff Parker
 Rod Brown
 Michael Portelli
 Robert Paterson
 Wayne Duffy
 Joe Capelli
 Corey Bissett
 Mark Antonowicz
 Daniel McFerran
 Jason Fitzpatrick
 David Pettenon
 Simon Millo
 Aaron Edwards
 Travis Edwards
 Mark Magor
 Jim Vickens
 Joe Murphy
 Zammy Muhtari
 Brian O'Donovan
 Dale Marshall
 Adam Szwadiak
 Colin Baulch
 Rudi Jakavicius
 Peter Trimboli
 Craig Psaila

Team of the Century

External links
 Official website

 Essendon District Football League
Australian rules football clubs in Melbourne
1947 establishments in Australia
Australian rules football clubs established in 1947
Sport in the City of Brimbank